The Pemba sunbird (Cinnyris pembae) is a species of bird in the sunbird family. It is endemic to Pemba Island, in Tanzania.

A breeding pair were seen feeding their chicks in the characteristic hanging nest on Unguja Island in June 2018.

References

Cinnyris
Pemba Island
Endemic birds of Tanzania
Birds described in 1905
Taxonomy articles created by Polbot
Northern Zanzibar–Inhambane coastal forest mosaic